Eucalyptus phenax, commonly known as green dumosa mallee or white mallee, is a species of mallee that is endemic to southern Australia. It has smooth bark, lance-shaped adult leaves, flower buds in groups of seven or nine, white flowers and cup-shaped to cylindrical fruit.

Description
It has smooth, creamy grey bark that is shed in ribbons. Flowering occurs between October and May and the flowers are white.

Taxonomy and naming
Eucalyptus phenax was first formally described in 1996 by Ian Brooker and Andrew Slee from material collected by Dean Nicolle near Tailem Bend in 1985. The specific epithet (phenax) is an ancient Greek word meaning "imposter", referring to the fact that this species was previously known as E. anceps, now a synonym of E.rugosa.

In 2000, Dean Nicolle described two subspecies and the names have been accepted by the Australian Plant Census:
 Eucalyptus phenax subsp. compressa D. Nicolle that has longer peduncles, larger flower buds and fruit than subspecies phenax;
 Eucalyptus phenax Brooker & Slee subsp. phenax.

Distribution and habitat
This eucalypt grows in mallee scrubs and is widely distributed in the southwest of Western Australia, the south-east of South Australia and the north-west of Victoria. It is most common in Western Australia where it occurs from near Bolgart through the southern wheatbelt to Esperance. Subspecies compressa is only known from the eastern side of Kangaroo Island and on the Fleurieu Peninsula.

Conservation status
In Western Australia, this eucalypt is classified as "not threatened" in Western Australia by the Western Australian Government Department of Parks and Wildlife.

See also
List of Eucalyptus species

References

Eucalypts of Western Australia
Flora of South Australia
Flora of Victoria (Australia)
phenax
Myrtales of Australia
Plants described in 1996
Taxa named by Ian Brooker